The Crown of Stephen Bocskai is a crown given by the Ottoman sultan to Stephen Bocskai, Prince of Hungary and Transylvania, in the early 17th century. It was produced from gold, rubies, spinels, emeralds, turquoises, pearls and silk (height , weight ).

History 

To save the independence of Transylvania, Bocskay assisted the Turks. In 1605, as a reward for his part in driving Basta out of Transylvania, the Hungarian Diet assembled at Medgyes/Mediasch (Mediaş) elected him Prince of Transylvania; in response the Ottoman sultan Ahmed I sent a special envoy to greet Bocskay and presented him with a splendid jewelled crown. Bocskay refused the royal dignity, but made skillful use of the Turkish alliance.

The crown is today displayed in the Kaiserliche Schatzkammer (Imperial Treasury) at the Hofburg in Vienna.

References

External links
Szalay - Baróti: A Magyar Nemzet Története

Stephen Bocskai
Crowns of the coat of Arms of Austria-Hungary